Choi Jong-hyun, better known by his stage name Changjo, is a South Korean singer, songwriter and actor. He is best known as a member of the South Korean boy group Teen Top.

Career
On July 10, 2010, Changjo made his debut as a member of Teen Top with their debut album Come into the World on MBC's Show! Music Core with the title track of the album "Clap". As of their debut, Teen Top has released one studio album, seven EPs and four single albums.

On December 28, 2021, Changjo announced that he will not renew his contract with TOP Media starting from January 10, 2022.  However, he will still remain as a member of Teen Top.

Filmography

Film

Television

References

South Korean pop singers
South Korean male singers
South Korean male idols
South Korean male film actors
South Korean male television actors
People from Chuncheon
1995 births
Living people
Teen Top members